Tris(2-phenylpyridine)iridium, abbreviated [Ir(ppy)3] is the organoiridium complex with the formula Ir(C6H4-C5H4N)3.  The complex, a yellow-green solid, is a derivative of Ir3+ bound to three monoanionic 2-pyridinylphenyl ligands.  It is electroluminescent, emitting green light.  The complex is observed with the facial stereochemistry, which is chiral.

The complex is prepared by cyclometalation reactions of 2-phenylpyridine and iridium trichloride, as represented by this idealized equation:
IrCl3  + 3C6H5-C5H4N  →  Ir(C6H4-C5H4N)3  +  3 HCl
The complex and many analogues have been investigated for application in photoredox catalysis. Its excited state has a reduction potential of −2.14 V, nearly 1 V more negative than the reduction potential of excited [Ru(bipy)3]2+.

References

2-Pyridyl compounds
Photochemistry
Organoiridium compounds